Shylock is a 2020 Indian Malayalam-language action thriller film directed by Ajay Vasudev. The film stars Mammootty, Rajkiran, Meena, Siddique, Kalabhavan Shajon, Baiju Santhosh,Bibin George, John Vijay and Hareesh Kanaran. Shylock is a slang term for a loan shark. The film is written by debutants Aneesh Hameed and Bibin Mohan and was released on 23 January 2020.

Plot 
Boss aka Shylock is a ruthless moneylender who provides money to a film producer Prathapa Varma to produce a film, but Prathapa Varma cheats Boss by not repaying the money, which enrages him. Varma is the friend of a corrupted Police Commissioner Felix John. Boss creates a ruckus on Prathapa Varma's film sets and abduct the film director, due to which Varma sends men to kill Boss. Boss defeats everyone and mocks Prathapa and Felix. Felix charges a fake case that Prathapa Varma's son Adithya Varma has gone missing and Boss is the kidnapper. The police arrest Boss but a piece of video evidence proves that Adithyan is celebrating Holi in Nagpur with Felix's daughter Jewel. 

Felix is forced to release Boss. On the way home, Varma confronts Boss and demands to know the whereabouts of Adithyan. After the video was telecasted, Boss reveals that he kidnapped and killed Adithyan by using Varma's car claiming it as an accident. During Adhitya's funeral, Felix and Prathapa Varma doubt that Boss was part of a plot that they did before. Boss confirms this. His associates ask him, but Boss doesn't respond and receives a call which leads Boss going to a house where an old man named Ayyanar wakes up. His associates question him once again. Boss reveals that his real name is Devan and that Ayyanar is his brother and reveals his past: 
 
7 years ago: Devan used to live with his rich family. Devan's cousin Velumurugan is in love with a woman named Poonkuzhali. Poonkuzhali's family declined their relationship due to caste differences. Devan and Ayyanar fights Poonkuzhali's elder brother Rangan and his henchman and convinces Poonkuzhali to marry Devan's cousin. Rangan is angered by this and teams up with Felix and Prathapa Varma to get revenge on Devan and his family. Devan has to go to Chennai for a few days. During this time, a producer asks Ayyanar for money. Ayyanar agrees, but on the condition that Devan, who aspires to be an actor should act in the movie. Rangan, Rangan's brother, Felix, Prathapa Varma and their henchmen arrive at Ayyanar's house and kill the producer and fights with Ayyanar. 

Rangan kills Ayyanar's wife, Lakshmi. In revenge, Ayyanar kills Rangan by stabbing him. Rangan's brother realizes that Felix and his men were cheating him and Rangan and thus he gets killed by Felix. Adhityan and his henchman kill all the family members except Ayyanar who is stabbed. Assuming him to be dead, Felix and Prathapa Varma leave. Devan returns that night, only to find his family members dead. He finds that Ayyanar is still alive and takes him to a hospital. The doctor says that everyone except Ayyanar is dead but Ayyanar will be crippled for life. 

Present: Felix and Prathapa Varma also learn about Boss's past. Boss kidnaps Prathapa's and Felix's friend Chacko and Felix's son Joel. They find Chacko heavily drunk and strapped to a chair and Joel murdered. Chacko provokes Felix by telling that Boss will kill everyone and they can't do anything. Enraged, Felix kills Chacko. Boss calls him and challenges Prathapa Varma and Felix for a final confrontation in his old house. They both agree to the challenge and reaches the venue where Boss overpowers their henchman and subdues Felix. Ayyanar stabs Felix to death while Boss kills Prathapa Varma. With no one else to trouble him, Boss takes care of Ayyanar continuing his business as Shylock.

Cast 

 Mammootty as Boss/Vaalu
 Rajkiran as Ayyanar 
 Meena as Lakshmi Ayyanar
 Siddique as  Commissioner Felix John
 Kalabhavan Shajohn as Prathapa Varma
 Baiju Santhosh as Balakrishna Panicker 
 Hareesh Kanaran as Ganapathi
 Bibin George as Velmurugan
 Arjun Nandhakumar as Ram
 Ameenul Irfan as Raheem
 Arthana Binu as Poonkuzhali Velmurugan
 John Vijay as Rangan
 Ajai Vasudev as Thotta Raja
 Rafi as Chacko
 John Kaippallil as Adithya Varma
 Vinu Chemmalakuzhy as Joel Felix
 Jaise Jose as Isaac
 Udayakrishna as himself 
 Ambika Mohan as Meenakshi Ammal
 Prasanth Alexander as Broker Kumar
 G. Marimuthu as Chithappa
 Rajalakshmi as Chinnamma
 Jayaprakash as Doctor 
 Hareesh Peradi as Menon (Cameo)
 Santhosh Keezhattoor as Cinema Secretary 
 Jewel as Tejal
 Jai Vishnu as News Reporter
 Binu Adimaly as Saji, production controller
 Laya as Felix John's wife
 Joel Jo George as Chitappa's son
 Ramya Krishnan as Neelambari (archive footage in "Kanne Kanne Veesathe")

Production 
Principal photography of the film began on 9 August 2019.  Mammootty joined the sets a week after the shoot started.

The film marks the debut of actor Raj Kiran in the Malayalam film. Raj Kiran and Meena who had earlier worked in Pasamulla Pandiyare (1997) is acting together after 23 years. Actor Bibin George was chosen for an important role.

The art direction of the film was done by Girish Menon.

Release
The film was scheduled for release on 23 January 2020 along with a Tamil dubbed version named Kuberan. The film's Tamil version along with a Telugu dub released as Kuberan on the Aha streaming platform.

Dubbed versions 
The film was dubbed and released in Tamil as Kuberan. Later, the film was dubbed in Telugu, Hindi and Kannada and released with the same title.

Music 

The film's music is composed by Gopi Sundar. The soundtrack was launched on 18 January 2020.

Reception

Box office
The film was released on more than 1200 screens worldwide. The film received mixed reviews, but was commercial success, and collected  in its first weekend. The film collected  within 5 days of its release.It completed 400 special shows in 4 days and first ever 4000 housefull shows  in mollywood. The film has collected  worldwide,  overseas on its first day. The film earned  in the Kerala state. The film was opened well on the first day and got an immense occupancy at Cochin, Thiruvananthapuram. Critics claimed that the first half is purely fans stuff and also complained about the routine story but still, Mammotty fans are enjoying the film as the film is entertaining.
Kerala Box Office Collection is ,Overseas Box Office Collection ,

Critical response
This film received mixed reviews. Sajin Shrijith of The New Indian Express gave 3.5 out of 5 stars stating "Shylock is an exuberant celebration of Mammootty, the star, that attempts to milk his charisma to the fullest". Anjana George of The Times of India gave 3 out of 5 stars stating "For the fans of 'mega star Mammootty', Shylock is a treat and for the followers of actor Mammootty, this is a complete 'no'."

Cris from The News Minute rated 3.5 out of 5 and wrote: "Yet another Mammootty 'mass' movie that numbs the mind.  It is running out of boring descriptions for itself". Manoj Kumar R. of The Indian Express rated 1 out of 5 star and said: "You know this story. You know how things would pan out. And you know what happens to the bad guys even before the film arrives at its depressingly predictable climax".

Anna M. M. Vetticad of Firstpost rated 0.25 out of 5 stars and wrote that "To compensate perhaps for the absolute lack of novelty in the script, camerawork and all else here, multiple references are made to other films and their Tamil superstars.

References

External links 
 

2020 films
2020s Malayalam-language films
Indian action thriller films
Films scored by Gopi Sundar
2020 action thriller films
Films directed by Ajai Vasudev